Focusing may refer to:
 Adjusting an optical system to minimize defocus aberration
 Focusing (psychotherapy), a psychotherapeutic technique

See also
Focus (disambiguation)